Aparna is a 1993 Malayalam-language Indian feature film directed by PK Radhakrishnan.

References

1993 films
1990s Malayalam-language films